This is a list of hospitals in Ankara Province, Turkey. Ankara, Turkey's capital, has more than 60 hospitals.

State hospitals
Ankara Egitim Ve Arastirma Hastanesi (Ankara Training and Research Hospital)
Ankara Fizik Tedavi Ve Rehabilitasyon Merkezi / Ankara Physical Therapy and Rehabilitation Center
Ankara Numune Hastanesi / Ankara Numune Hospital
Ankara Onkoloji Hastanesi / Ankara Oncology Hospital
Ankara Verem Savaş Derneği Hastanesi / Ankara Battling Tuberculosis Foundation Hospital
Atatürk Araştırma Hastanesi (eski adiyla Trafik Hastanesi) / Atatürk Research Hospital (previously Traffic Hospital)
Atatürk Sanatoryumu Göğüs Hastalıkları Hastanesi / Atatürk Senatorium Hospital for Breast Diseases
Büyükşehir Belediye Hastanesi / Greater Municipality Hospital
Deri Ve Zührevi Hastalıkları Hastanesi / Dermatological & Venereal Diseases Hospital
Dr. M. Ülker Acil Yardım Ve Travmatoloji Hastanesi / Dr. M. Ülker Emergency Trauma Hospital
Dr. Sami Ulus Çocuk Hastanesi / Dr. Sami Ulus Children's Hospital
Dr. Zekai Tahir Burak Kadın Hastanesi / Dr. Zekai Tahir Burak Women's Hospital
Etimesgut Devlet Hastanesi / Etimesgut State Hospital
Muhittin Ülker Acil Yardım Hastanesi / Muhittin Ülker Emergency Hospital
PTT Rüzgarlı Dispanseri / PTT Rüzgarlı Dispensary
S.B. Ankara Hastanesi / S.B. Ankara Hospital
Türkiye Yüksek İhtisas Hastanesi / Turkish High Specialty Hospital
TC Ziraat Bankası Hastanesi / Turkish Ziraat Bank Hospital
TCDD Hastanesi / Turkish State Railways Hospital,
Ankara Meslek Hastanesi / Ankara Occupational Hospital

Social security hospitals
SSK Ankara Eğitim Hastanesi, Dışkapı
SSK Ankara Çocuk Hastanesi
SSK İhtisas Hastanesi
SSK Meslek Hastalıkları Hastanesi
SSK Ulus Hastanesi
SSK Ulucanlar Dispanseri
SSK Yenişehir Dispanseri

Birth hospitals
SSK Etlik Doğumevi
Zübeyde Hanım Doğumevi

University hospitals
Ankara Üniversitesi Tıp Fakültesi Hastanesi
Ankara Üniversitesi Tıp Fakültesi Cebeci Hastanesi
Ankara Üniversitesi Tıp Fakültesi İbni Sina Hastanesi
Başkent Üniversitesi Hastanesi(private)
Fatih Üniversitesi Tıp Fakültesi Hastanesi(private)
Gazi Üniversitesi Tıp Fakültesi Hastanesi(state)
Gazi Üniversitesi Tıp Fakültesi Gölbaşı Hastanesi(state)
Hacettepe Üniversitesi Tıp Fakültesi Hastanesi

Military hospitals
Ankara Gülhane Askeri Tıp Akademisi
Ankara Mevki Asker Hastanesi
Etimesgut Hava Hastanesi

Private hospitals
ANKARA VEREM SAVAŞ DERNEĞİ NUSRET KARASU GÖĞÜS HASTALIKLARI VE TÜBERKÜLOZ HASTANESİ
KOLAN BRITISH HOSPITAL LTD. ŞTİ.
LOKMAN HEKİM HAST.
ÇANKAYA HASTANESİ
BRITISH MEDICAL HOSPITAL 
ÖZEL AKAY HASTANESİ
ÖZEL AKROPOL HASTANESİ
ÖZEL ANKARA GÜVEN HASTANESİ
ÖZEL ANKARA MEDICAL PARK HASTANESİ
ÖZEL ANKARA MEMORIAL HASTANESI
ÖZEL ANKARA UMUT HASTANESİ
ÖZEL BAYINDIR HASTANESİ
ÖZEL BİLGİ HASTANESİ
ÖZEL ERYAMAN HASTANESİ
ÖZEL ETİMED HASTANESI
ÖZEL KEÇİÖREN HASTANESİ
ÖZEL KORU ANKARA HASTANESİ
ÖZEL KORU SİNCAN HASTANESİ
ÖZEL KUDRET İNTERNATIONAL HOSPITAL
ÖZEL LOKMAN HEKİM ANKARA HASTANESİ
ÖZEL LÖSANTE LÖSEMİLİ ÇOCUKLAR HASTANESİ
ÖZEL LİV HOSPITAL ANKARA
ÖZEL MEDİCANA İNTERNATİONAL ANKARA HASTANESİ
ÖZEL MİNASERA ALDAN HASTANESİ
ÖZEL NATOMED HASTANESİ
ÖZEL ORTADOĞU HASTANESİ
ÖZEL ORTADOĞU 19 MAYIS HASTANESİ
ÖZEL POLATLI CAN HASTANESİ
ÖZEL TOBB ETÜ HASTANESİ
ÖZEL YÜZÜNCÜYIL HASTANESİ
ÖZEL ÇANKAYA YAŞAM HASTANESİ

See also

References

Ankara-related lists
Hospitals
Ankara